Annona tomentosa is a species of plant in the family Annonaceae. It is native to Bolivia and Brazil. Robert Elias Fries, the Swedish botanist who first formally described the species, named it after the dense woolly hairs ( in Latin) covering its branches and leaves.

Description
It is a bush reaching 0.5-1.5 meters in height. The younger branches are covered in yellow-brown, dense, woolly hairs. Its internodes are 1-4 centimeters long. Its petioles are 3-4 millimeters long and covered in dense woolly hairs. Its oblong to oval leaves are 7-19 by 3.5-9 centimeters. The leaves are rounded or indented at their base and come to a tapered point at their tip. The leaves are covered in dense hair on their upper and lower surfaces.  The leaves have 8-18 secondary veins emanating at an acute angle from either side of the midrib. Inflorescences emerge between nodes and have 1-2 flowers.  Its pedicels are 1.5 centimeters long and have two kidney-shaped bracts that enclose their base.  Its rounded sepals come to a point at the tip, are covered in dense woolly hairs on their outer surface, and are hairless on their inner surface. Its outer petals are 1.7 by 2 centimeters and come to a taper point or have blunt tips.  The outer surfaces of the outer petals are covered in dense grey-yellow hairs. Its inner petals are 0.6-0.7 by 2 centimeters, have a keeled back and come to a point at their tip. Its stamens are 3 millimeters long.  Its ovaries are covered in dense white hairs.

Reproductive biology
The pollen of Annona tenuiflora is shed as permanent tetrads. Pollinators include Cyclocephala beetles.

Habitat and distribution
It has been observed in fields with dry sand dunes.

Uses
It is used in Brazilian traditional medicine and extracts from the leaves have been reported to provide antinociceptive pain relief and have anti-inflammatory activity in studies with mice.

References

tomentosa
Flora of Bolivia
Flora of Brazil
Traditional Brazilian medicine
Plants described in 1906
Taxa named by Robert Elias Fries